The Ionia Formation is a geologic formation in Michigan. It preserves fossils dating back to the Jurassic period.

References
 

Jurassic System of North America
Oxfordian Stage
Stratigraphy of Michigan